The list of Reginald Fessenden patents contains the innovation of his pioneering experiments. Reginald Aubrey Fessenden received hundreds of patents for devices in fields such as high-powered transmitting, sonar, and television.

Patents
 , "Lead-in Wire for Incandescent Electric Lamps" – 18 February 1891
 , "Manufacture of Incandescent Electric Lamps" – 9 June 1891
 , "Molding for Electrical Conductors" – 10 October 1893
 , "Pencil for Incandescent Lamps" – 12 December 1899
 , "Pencil for Incandescent Lamps" – 12 December 1899
 , "Incandescent Lamp" – 12 December 1899
 , "Incandescent Lamp" – 12 December 1899
 , "Incandescent Lamp" – 12 December 1899
 , "Induction Coil for X-ray Apparatus" – 6 March 1900
 , "X-ray Apparatus" – 1 May 1900
 , "Incandescent Lamp" – 29 May 1900
 , "Induction-coil" – July 1900
 , "Incandescent Lamp" – 19 March 1901
 , "Wireless Telegraphy" – 12 August 1902
 , "Apparatus for Wireless Telegraphy" – 12 August 1902
 , "Wireless Telegraphy" – 12 August 1902
 , "Wireless Telegraphy" – 12 August 1902
 , "Conductor for Wireless Telegraphy" – 12 August 1902 
 , "Wireless Signaling" (heterodyne principle) – 12 August 1902 
 , "Apparatus for Wireless Telegraphy" (compressed air spark gap transmitter) – 12 August 1902 
 , "Wireless Signaling", – 12 August 1902 (transmit-receive switch)
 , "Wireless Signaling", – 12 August 1902
 , "Current Actuated Wave Responsive Device" ("barretter" detector) – August 1902
 , "Signaling by Electromagnetic Waves" – issued 12 August 1902
 , "Signaling by Electromagnetic Waves" (ground plane) – 12 August 1902
 , "Apparatus for Signaling by Electromagnetic Waves" (voice modulation of 50 kHz alternator – continuous wave transmitter) – 12 August 1902 
 , "Current Operated Receiver for Electromagnetic Waves" – 2 December 1902
 , "Selective Signaling by Electromagnetic Waves" (multiplex transmission and reception) – 2 December 1902
 , "Transmission and Receipt of Signals" – 5 May 1903
 , "Selective Signaling by Electromagnetic Waves" – 5 May 1903
 , "Receiver for Electromagnetic Waves" – 5 May 1903
 , "Receiver for Signaling" – 5 May 1903
 , "Signaling by Electromagnetic Waves" – 5 May 1903
 , "Signaling by Electromagnetic Waves" – May 1903
 , "Receiver for Electromagnetic Waves" (improved "barretter"—actually electrolytic detector) – May 1903
 , "Signaling by Electromagnetic Waves" – 9 June 1903
 , "Method of Utilizing the Energy of Waves" – 16 June 1903
 , "Signaling by Electromagnetic Waves" – 27 October 1903
 , "Signaling by Electromagnetic Waves" – 27 October 1903
 , "Selective Signaling" – 23 February 1904
 , "Signaling by Electromagnetic Waves" – 23 February 1904
 , "Signaling by Electromagnetic Waves" – 8 March 1904
 , "Signaling by Electromagnetic Waves" – 8 March 1904
 , "Apparatus for Transmitting and Receiving Signals" – 6 December 1904
 , "Receiver for Electromagnetic Waves" (sealed/pressurized electrolytic detector) – 4 July 1905
 , "Signaling by Electromagnetic Waves" – 4 July 1905
 , "Signaling by Electromagnetic Waves" – 4 July 1905
 , "Aerial for Wireless Signaling" (shows insulated base) – 4 July 1905
 , "Signaling by Electromagnetic Waves" (shows the Brant Rock tower) – 4 July 1905
 , "Wireless Telegraphy" – 4 July 1905
 , "Condenser" – 4 July 1905
 , "Capacity" – 13 March 1906
 , "Wireless Telegraphy" – 1 September 1908
 , "Electric Signaling" – 16 March 1909
 , "Receiver for Electromagnetic Waves" – 30 March 1909
 , "Apparatus for Wireless Signaling" – 13 April 1909
 , "Signaling by Electromagnetic Waves" – 20 July 1909
 , "Producing High Frequency Oscillations" – 24 August 1909
 , "Method for Cleaning Guns" – 2 November 1909
 , "Method for Determining Positions of Vessels" – 30 November 1909
 , "Wireless Telegraphy" (antenna tuning) – 1 February 1910
 , "Signaling by Electromagnetic Waves" – 26 April 1910
 , "Wireless Signaling" – 7 June 1910
 , "Receiver for Electromagnetic Waves" – 21 June 1910
 , "Method of Signaling" – 21 June 1910
 , "Improvements in Wireless Telegraphy" – 1 November 1910
 , "Electrical Signaling" – 20 December 1910
 , "Signaling by Electromagnetic Waves" – 18 July 1911
 , "Signaling by Electromagnetic Waves" – 29 August 1911
 , "Electrical Signaling" – 29 August 1911
 , "Determining Positions of Vessels" – 29 August 1911
 , "Means for the Transmission of Energy by Electromagnetic Waves" – 30 January 1912
 , "Signaling" – 5 March 1912
 , "Signaling by Electromagnetic Waves" – 12 March 1912
 , "Wireless Signaling" – 9 April 1912
 , "Wireless Telegraphy" – 13 August 1912
 , "High Frequency Electrical Conductor" – 1 October 1912
 , "Contact for Electromagnetic Mechanism" – 31 December 1912
 , "Electrical Signaling Apparatus" – 1925
 , "Wireless Telegraphy" (antenna tuning)– April 1913
 , "Signaling by Sound and Other Longitudinal Elastic Impulses" – 1 September 1914
 , "Agricultural Engineering" – 22 December 1914
 , "Sending Mechanism for Electromagnetic Waves" – 2 February 1916
 , "Apparatus for Converting Heat Into Work" – 16 March 1915
 , "Electric Signaling" – 23 March 1915
 , "Wireless Telegraphy" – 23 March 1915
 , "Method of Transmitting and Receiving Electrical Energy" – 1 June 1915
 , "Improvements in Wireless Telegraphy" – 20 July 1915
 , "Amplifying Electrical Impulses" – 28 September 1915
 , "Apparatus for the transmission by electrical oscillation" – 12 October 1915
 , "Apparatus for Generating and Receiving Electromagnetic Waves" – 26 October 1915
 , "Signaling Apparatus Aerial Navigation" – 26 October 1915
 , "Apparatus for Wireless Signaling" – 28 December 1915
 , "Apparatus for Producing High Frequency Oscillations" – 4 January 1916
 , "Dynamo-Electric Machinery" – 4 January 1916
 , "Means of Transmitting Intelligence" – 8 February 1916
 , "Method of Transmitting Energy by Electromagnetic Waves" – 15 February 1916
 , "Electromagnetic Indicator" – 15 February 1916
 , "Wireless Signaling" – 11 April 1916
 , "Signaling by Electromagnetic Waves" – 30 May 1916
 , "Method of Using Pulverulent Matter As Fuel" – 11 July 1916
 , "Method and Apparatus for Submarine Signaling" – 5 December 1916
 , "Submarine, Subterranean, and Aerial Telephony" – 16 January 1917
 , "Apparatus for Phonograph Kinetoscopes" – 23 January 1917
 , "Power Plant" – 27, February 1917
 , "Method and Apparatus for Finding Ore Bodies" – 18 September 1917
 , "Method for Storing Power" – 20 November 1917
 , "Method and Apparatus for Producing Alternating Currents" – 7 May 1918
 , "Method and Apparatus for Agricultural Engineering" – 11 June 1918
 , "Method and Apparatus for Transmitting and Receiving Sound Waves Through Ground" – 25 June 1918
 , "Apparatus for Submarines" – 4 January 1919 
 , "Method of and Apparatus for Obtaining Increased Circulation" – 14 October 1919
 , "Detecting and Locating Ships" – 21 October 1919
 , "Method of and Apparatus for Detecting Low Frequency Impulses" – 3 August 1920
 , "Method and Apparatus for Submarine Signaling and Detection" – 3 August 1920
 , "Method and Apparatus for Submarine Signaling" – 3 August 1920
 , "Method and Apparatus for Sound Insulation" – 3 August 1920
 , "Method and Apparatus for Detecting Submarines" – 10 August 1920
 , "Wireless Direction Finder" – 12 April 1921
 , "Method and Apparatus for Signaling and Otherwise Utilizing Radiant Impulses" – 5 July 1921
 , "Sound-Signaling" – 5 July 1921
 , "Apparatus for Submarine Signaling" – 3 August 1920
 , "Submarine Signaling" – 18 October 1921
 , "Method and Apparatus for Submarine Signaling" – 18 October 1921
 , "Method and Apparatus for Submarine Signaling" – 22 November 1921
 , "Method and Apparatus for Inspecting Material" – 25 April 1922
 , "Method and Apparatus for Submarine Signaling" – 9 May 1922
 , "Method and Apparatus for Detecting, Measuring, and Utilizing Low Frequency Impulses" – 19 September 1922
 , "Acoustic Method and Apparatus" – 1 May 1923
 , "Directional Receiving of Submarine Signals" – 30 October 1923
 , "Method for Eliminating Undesired Impulses" – 6 November 1923
 , "Eliminating Disturbing Energy" – 21 April 1925
 , "Means for Eliminating Disturbing Noises" – 28 July 1925
 , "Method and Apparatus for Generating Electrical Oscillations" – 8 September 1925
 , "Apparatus for Directive Signaling" – 10 November 1925
 , "Infusor" (for making tea) – March 1926
 , "Method and Apparatus for Coordinating Radio and Phonograph Reproductions" – 1 February 1927
 , "Method and Apparatus for the Transmission of Energy by High Frequency Impulses" – 8 February 1927
 , "Method and Apparatus for Coordinating Radio and Phonograph Reproductions" – 21 June 1932
 , "Means for Parking Cars" – 11 October 1932
 , "Means for Modulating Electrical Energy by Light Impulses" – 28 February 1933
 , "Rotary Brush" – 14 March 1933
 , "Method and Apparatus for Sound Transmission" – 3 July 1934
 , "Height Indicator" – 19 February 1935
 , "Television System" – 3 November 1936
 , "Television Apparatus" – 3 November 1936

Reissued
  "Receiver for Electromagnetic Waves" – duplicate of 727,331 reissued May 1903
  "Wireless Telegraphy" – duplicate of 706,737 reissued 10 November 1903
  "Wireless Telegraphy" – duplicate of 706,737 reissued 10 November 1903
  "Acoustic Method and Apparatus" – duplicate of 1,453,316 reissued 10 29 June 1926

Fessenden, Reginald
United States science-related lists